(commonly known by its acronym, SRMTHFG, or simply, Super Robot Monkey Team) is an anime-influenced television series created by Ciro Nieli, one of the directors of Teen Titans, and the Showrunner & Executive Producer of Teenage Mutant Ninja Turtles, and produced by Jetix Animation Concepts with animation being done by The Answer Studio (who would later work on the Cartoon Network series Transformers: Animated). It was the first original show produced for the Jetix block and for the Jetix channels worldwide, where the show premiered on September 18, 2004.

Set mainly on the fictional planet of Shuggazoom, the series follows the adventures of five cyborg monkeys and a human boy named Chiro as they struggle to protect their planet – and the rest of the universe – from the forces of evil.

Plot 

The Super Robot Monkey Team is set in Shuggazoom City, a city that takes up a good portion of its planet, named Shuggazoom. The rest of the planet is divided into sparsely or entirely uninhabited zones. The largest of these making up the majority of the visible surface outside of Shuggazoom city is "The Zone of Wasted Years" which is a barren wasteland.

The main character is a boy named Chiro. When he was exploring the outskirts of the city, he stumbled upon a giant abandoned robot partially overgrown with plants but still accessible. Once inside, his curiosity got the better of him and he pulls an old power switch among a series of stasis tanks. In doing so, he awakened the five robotic monkeys that form the Super Robot Monkey Team Hyperforce. In the process Chiro also fused himself with the mysterious supernatural energy of the Power Primate, allowing him to transform into a stronger, braver fighter and the leader of the team. With the aid of the five Robot Monkeys: Sparx, Antauri, Gibson, Otto and Nova, their mission is to save Shuggazoom City from the Skeleton King, the main villain of the series, as well as any other evil forces that may threaten it.

Since Chiro was not born a superhero, or with any enhanced abilities, the five Robot Monkeys take up training him to hone his abilities which results in him leading the team. With each member possessing a different set of skills Chiro acts as a unifying force keeping them on point where they otherwise might fall to differing opinions, in addition to being familiar with the current culture of Shuggazoom. With the monkeys continuing to train Chiro he grows into the leader they need with the potential to fulfill his greater destiny as protector of the universe.

When fighting with larger enemies the Hyperforce uses the Super Robot, which can operate as a single entity or split into six separate vehicles for versatility. Its main attack, when combined as the whole robot, is Lasertron Fury. This powerful energy beam that is fired from its chest is capable of destroying large objects or hostile entities while an array of smaller weaponry is used to handle other lesser threats. The Super Robot also serves as Chiro and the Monkeys' headquarters and home while parked on its landing pad in Shuggazoom City.

Over the course of the series the history of both Shuggazoom and the Robot Monkeys is expanded upon revealing they were created long ago specifically to combat the evil Skeleton King by a brilliant inventor known only as the Alchemist. Having unintentionally released a great evil into the world with his experiments the Hyperforce was his attempt to prepare for an uncertain future where defenses would be needed. The Hyperforce itself also expanded as the series ran to include various allies and a rogues gallery of enemies as recurring characters.

Shuggazoom

Shuggazoom City 
The only city on the planet, Shuggazoom, Shuggazoom city is the home of the Hyperforce. Containing an array of business along with housing, parks, and open spaces the cityscape was sufficient to hide an entire robot from view or interest until it had become overgrown with plant life. The city is also built effectively on stilts above a large reservoir that extends miles downward giving it a steady supply of clean drinking water.

Zone of Wasted Years 
A rocky desert located on the outskirts of Shuggazoom City that landscapes the rest of the planet Shuggazoom. The Pit of Doom is located here, as well as the deep gorge where the Hyperforce found Captain Shuggazoom.

Savage Lands 
A tropical jungle hidden within a series of caves located beneath Shuggazoom's surface. The jungle contains large deposits of the black ooze that is used to create the Formless, and thus the environment is inhabited by various Formless creatures. It is likely that the Savage Lands were once occupied by some sort of ancient civilization, as it houses a great deal of seemingly ancient temples and tombs. One of these temples was used as Valeena's base of operations, which she ruled over the area from after receiving her powers from Skeleton King. The Alchemist's laboratory is also located here.

Sea of Ice 
A frozen plain located on Shuggazoom's North Pole that is occupied only by Morlath and his snow monsters. The Ice Crystal of Vengeance was located here.

Blasted Lands 
A long forgotten realm located south of the Zone of Wasted Years. Centuries ago, a massive war struck here until everyone involved was destroyed. Unrelenting hatred rose. Since then, the Blasted Lands became a burning and unstable landscape. The Fire of Hate was located here.

Arcane Isle 
A small island housing a large monolith that serves as a portal to the Netherworld, the home dimension of the Dark Ones.

Ranger 7 
The near uninhabited moon of Shuggazoom. This is where the supermax space prison is and where the fuzzy ball known as Thingy was found.

Episodes

Production 
Super Robot Monkey Team Hyperforce Go! was created by Ciro Nieli, who previously worked on Teen Titans and ¡Mucha Lucha!. As is obvious from the visual appearance of the show, there is a significant anime influence present, despite being produced for American television. It was also influenced by Star Trek, Super Sentai (most recognizably exemplified in the West by Power Rangers), Voltron, and Star Wars. The show also contains various references to pop culture, a notable example being the episode "Season of the Skull", which is an obvious parody of the 1970s thriller The Wicker Man.

Lynne Naylor, character designer for Samurai Jack and Hi Hi Puffy AmiYumi served as the show's Art Director, and her husband Chris Reccardi, writer for Samurai Jack and The Powerpuff Girls was the show's assistant director. Naylor and Reccardi were also known for creating the failed Nickelodeon pilot in 2007, titled the Modifyers. Chris Reccardi sadly died of a heart attack in 2019. The show's art style drew influence from some classic anime, such as Speed Racer, Astro Boy, and Cyborg 009.

Chris Battle worked as the show's prop designer. He's also designed characters for shows like Dexter's Laboratory, the Powerpuff Girls, and Aaahh!!! Real Monsters.

Possible revival 
In December 5, 2014, Anime Superhero interviewed with Ciro Nieli about if there will be a chance for him to continue the series, as he said "Oh yeah. There's a finale planned for that and I don't know how I'm gonna do it but I swear that I'm gonna do it someday. I can do it as one movie or I can do it as a whole season, it just depends on how much breadth I want to give it. Look at the last episode. You can either pick it up from there or you can go 'Five years later: it's the war of the undead vs the robot chimps.' It's this crazy battlefield where all forces have kinda teamed up against the ultimate evil. It'd be awesome. It's all figured out pretty much. Everyone bugs me about it all the time and I really wanna sit down and tell everybody what happens but I'd rather just make it someday and give it to them. Worst case scenario: before I die I'll do a perfect graphic novel of it and then Disney can sue me posthumously 'cause they now completely own it and that's how it goes [laughs]. I guess I could make a comic and change the names and hairdos…"

As of February 2023, there hasn’t been any updates about the shows revival.

Broadcast 
SRMTHG premiered on ABC Family's Jetix programming block on September 18, 2004. It also aired on Toon Disney's Jetix block until the Jetix programming block was taken off of ABC Family in August 2006, and the series began to air exclusively on Toon Disney.

It was also shown on Jetix UK from January 1, 2005, but was taken off the air on July 22, 2006, for unknown reasons. The entire series was, however, broadcast in the UK on GMTV's Toonattik.

In Ireland it was shown on RTÉ Two as part of "The Den" children's programming block.

The series was produced for widescreen, but originally shown cropped due to network restrictions.

Each episode runs for 30 minutes, with commercials.

Its theme song is performed by Japanese synthpop/new wave band Polysics.

Disney did not renew the show for a fifth season possibly due to low merchandise sales, leaving it with a Cliffhanger ending.

On July 17, 2020, the series began streaming on Disney+.

References

External links 

 
 

 
2004 American television series debuts
2006 American television series endings
2000s American animated television series
2000s American science fiction television series
American children's animated action television series
American children's animated space adventure television series
American children's animated science fantasy television series
American children's animated superhero television series
Animated television series about monkeys
Animated television series about robots
Anime-influenced Western animated television series
Cyberpunk television series
Television series by Disney Television Animation
Disney Channel original programming
Disney XD original programming
English-language television shows
Jetix original programming
Super robot anime and manga
Teen animated television series
Teen superhero television series
Television series by Disney
Television series set on fictional planets
Television series created by Ciro Nieli